Algernon Edward Urban Sartoris (March 17, 1877 – January 17, 1928)  was an American diplomat, and the grandson of Ulysses S. Grant.

He was born on March 17, 1877, to Nellie Grant and Algernon Charles Frederick Sartoris in Washington, DC. He resigned from the military in 1903. He married Cécile Noufflard on April 20, 1904, in Paris, France. They had a son, Herbert Charles Urban Grant Sartoris. 

He died in 1928 in  Paris, France.

References

1877 births
1928 deaths
20th-century American diplomats
Grant family
American expatriates in France